Pita Maile (born 30 May 1990) is a Tongan rugby league footballer who plays as a , back-row or on the . He previously played for the Melbourne Storm in the NYC and was a part of their 2009 NYC Grand Final winning team. He is a Tongan international.

References

External links
Melbourne Storm profile

1990 births
Living people
Melbourne Storm players
Rugby league centres
Rugby league second-rows
Rugby league wingers
Tonga national rugby league team players
Tongan rugby league players